Coula is a monotypic genus of trees native to tropical Africa, containing the sole species Coula edulis Baill. Currently placed in the family Olacaceae, recent genetic evidence suggests this family is paraphyletic, and that Coula and related genera should be transferred to a new family Strombosiaceae.

References

Olacaceae
Santalales genera
Taxa named by Henri Ernest Baillon